The 1949 winners of the Torneo di Viareggio (in English, the Viareggio Tournament, officially the Viareggio Cup World Football Tournament Coppa Carnevale), the annual youth football tournament held in Viareggio, Tuscany, are listed below.

Format

The 10 teams are organized in knockout rounds, all played single tie. Four teams have to play a preliminary knockout round to access quarter finals.

Participating teams

Italian teams

  Fiorentina
  Lazio
  Livorno
  Lucchese
  Milan
  Sampdoria
  Viareggio

European teams

  Menton
  Nice
  Bellinzona

Tournament fixtures

Champions

Footnotes

External links
 Official Site (Italian)
 Results on RSSSF.com

1949
1948–49 in Italian football
1948–49 in French football
1948–49 in Swiss football